The Convair XC-99, AF Ser. No. 43-52436, is a prototype heavy cargo aircraft built by Convair for the United States Air Force. It was the largest piston-engined land-based transport aircraft ever built, and was developed from the Convair B-36 Peacemaker bomber, sharing the wings and some other structures with it. The first flight was on 24 November 1947 in San Diego, California, and after testing it was delivered to the Air Force on 26 May 1949.  The Convair Model 37 was a planned civil passenger variant based on the XC-99 but was not built.

Design and development
A cargo lift was installed for easier loading. The engines face rearward in a pusher configuration.

Planned civil passenger variant
The Convair Model 37 was a large civil passenger design derived from the XC-99 but was never built. The Model 37 was to be of similar proportions to the XC-99;  length,  wingspan, and a high-capacity, double-deck fuselage.

Fifteen aircraft were ordered by Pan American Airways for transatlantic service. However, the fuel and oil consumption of the six  Wasp Major radials powering the XC-99 and B-36 meant that the design was not economically viable, and the hoped-for turboprop powerplants did not materialize fast enough. The low number of orders were not sufficient to initiate production, and the project was abandoned.

Operational history

In July 1950, the XC-99 flew its first cargo mission, "Operation Elephant." It transported  of cargo, including engines and propellers for the B-36, from San Diego to Kelly Air Force Base in San Antonio, Texas, a record it would later break when it lifted  from an airfield at  elevation. In August 1953, the XC-99 would make its longest flight, to Rhein-Main Air Base, Germany, by way of Kindley Air Force Base, Bermuda and Lajes Field in the Azores. It carried more than  each way. It attracted much attention everywhere it flew.

The US Air Force determined that it had no need for such a large, long-range transport at that time, and no more were ordered. The sole XC-99 served until 1957, including much use during the Korean War. It made twice weekly trips from Kelly AFB to the aircraft depot at McClellan Air Force Base, California, transporting supplies and parts for the B-36 bomber while returning by way of other bases or depots making pick-ups and deliveries along the way. During its operational life, the XC-99 logged over 7,400 hours total time, and transported more than 60 million pounds (27,000 metric tons) of cargo. The aircraft made its last flight on 19 March 1957, landing at Kelly Air Force Base, where it would remain for the next 47 years. The then-United States Air Force Museum at Wright-Patterson Air Force Base near Dayton, Ohio, requested that the aircraft be flown there for display, but the Air Force refused due to the $7,400 cost of the flight.

Retirement and preservation

The aircraft was put on display at Kelly AFB near San Antonio, Texas, in 1957. Deterioration of the airframe due to the high magnesium content was beyond local abilities to address. The aircraft was later moved to a grassy field near the base and in 1993 the USAF moved it back to the Kelly AFB.  In 1995, Kelly AFB was identified for closure via BRAC, although some portions would remain under USAF control as the Kelly Field Annex to adjacent Lackland AFB, it was deemed that a new location be identified for the XC-99.

Disassembly of the aircraft began at Kelly Field in April 2004. and the airframe was moved in pieces from Kelly to the National Museum of the United States Air Force (NMUSAF) at Wright-Patterson Air Force Base. By the summer of 2008, the transfer was complete and the parts were lying outside the museum. The aircraft had continued to suffer additional corrosion during its years in Texas and was found to be in worse condition than expected, with the restoration task being beyond the resources of the museum in a realistic time scale. Some major components such as the wing spar would need to be completely replaced.

The NMUSAF's plans for the restoration and display of the XC-99 are displayed in a case with a 1:72 scale model made by Lt Col Howard T. Meek, USAF (Ret).

In an effort to preserve the aircraft for future restoration, the XC-99 was later moved incrementally to the 309th Aerospace Maintenance and Regeneration Group (309 AMARG) storage facility at Davis–Monthan Air Force Base, in Tucson, Arizona, where it will remain, in an area containing other aircraft belonging to the NMUSAF until the museum is able to restore it. In 2014, Lieutenant General John L. Hudson, USAF (Ret), director of the NMUSAF said that there would be insufficient resources for restoration for the foreseeable future.

Current location of the aircraft
XC-99, AF Ser. No. 43-52436 is now part of the National Museum of the United States Air Force collection at Wright-Patterson AFB. The aircraft was disassembled at Kelly AFB, Texas and its sections transported to NMUSAF for anti-corrosion preservation and reassembly there. It was subsequently transported in the summer of 2012 to Davis-Monthan AFB and is stored in Area 20 of the 309 AMARG complex, the so-called "Boneyard", pending financial resources sufficient to restore the aircraft and return it to NMUSAF for display.

Specifications (XC-99)

See also

References

Notes

Bibliography

 Dorr, Robert F. "Saving the XC-99." Air Force Times, 12 August 1998.
 Dorr, Robert F. "XC-99 is a treasure." Air Force Times, 10 June 2000.
 Jacobsen, Meyers K. Convair B-36: A Comprehensive History of America's "Big Stick". Atglen, Pennsylvania: Schiffer Military History, 1997. .
 Jacobsen, Meyers K. Convair B-36: A Photo Chronicle. Atglen, Pennsylvania: Schiffer Military History, 1999. .
 Jacobsen, Meyers K and Ray Wagner. B-36 in Action (Aircraft in Action Number 42). Carrollton, Texas: Squadron/Signal Publications Inc., 1980. .
 Jenkins, Dennis R. Convair B-36 Peacemaker. St. Paul, Minnesota: Specialty Press Publishers and Wholesalers, 1999. .
 Johnsen, Frederick A. Thundering Peacemaker, the B-36 Story in Words and Pictures. Tacoma, Washington: Bomber Books, 1978.
 Miller, Jay and Roger Cripliver. "B-36: The Ponderous Peacemaker." Aviation Quarterly, Vol. 4, No. 4, 1978.
 Wegg, John. General Dynamics Aircraft and their Predecessors. London: Putnam, 1990. .

External links

Goleta Air and Space Museum Convair XC-99 and Model 37
'U.S. To Europe With 50 tons", Popular Science, March 1950, early article with drawing of first layout of XC-99
"Biggest Air Freighter Goes To War" 1951 article on first operational use of XC-99, photos and drawings
National Museum of the USAF, XC-99 photos, along with the photo of the 1/72nd scale XC-99 model by Lt. Col. Howard Meek
Big Fella – Air Force Magazine

C-099
Convair C-099
Six-engined pusher aircraft
Mid-wing aircraft
Aircraft first flown in 1947
XC-99
Double-deck aircraft